Matthew Flynn (born May 23, 1970) is an American musician and record producer. He is the drummer for the pop rock band Maroon 5. In 2006, after being the band's touring drummer for two years, Flynn officially replaced the original drummer of Maroon 5, Ryan Dusick, who left the group due to serious wrist and shoulder injuries sustained from constant touring after the release of their first album, Songs About Jane in 2002.

Prior to joining Maroon 5, Flynn has played drums for The B-52's, Chicago, Gavin DeGraw and Gandhi.

Early life
Flynn was born in Woodstock, New York. When Flynn was 14 years old, he picked up his first pair of drumsticks in his father's basement and immediately started drumming the beat to "Jump" by Van Halen, impressing his father greatly. Later that year he came third in his high school talent show, behind stand up comedian Daniel Tosh and a dance crew known as "Tropic Lightning".

Flynn graduated from Gunn High School and briefly attended San Diego State University.

Personal life
Flynn is married to Heidi Ford, who has a fraternal twin named Jenny "Jenni" Ford. On June 5, 2007, Flynn's wife gave birth to their second child, named Michael Ford Flynn. His elder daughter is named Ryan.

Gear
Over the years, Flynn has played Yamaha and Ludwig drums, as well as Sabian and Zildjian cymbals, among other brands. Currently, he endorses Sugar Percussion (since 2015), Paiste cymbals (since 2014), Remo drumheads and Vater drumsticks. also he used Roland pads and triggers.

Discography

Maroon 5 

As a touring member
 Live – Friday the 13th (2005)

As an official member
 It Won't Be Soon Before Long (2007)
 Hands All Over (2010)
 Overexposed (2012)
 V (2014)
 Red Pill Blues (2017)
 Jordi (2021)

Other albums or songs, on which Flynn has played
 Botanica – Botanica vs. the Truth Fish (2005) ("Good")
 State Radio – Us Against the Crown (2006)
 Gavin DeGraw – Free (2009)
 K'naan – Troubadour (2009)
  The Skypilot – Skypilot (EP) (2012)
 Hi-Burns – Night Moves (2015)
 Daniel Davies – Signals (2020)
 Liam Payne – Ron's Gone Wrong: Original Motion Picture Soundtrack (2021) ("Sunshine")

References

Sources
 Maroon 5 Band website, “Band Bios" https://web.archive.org/web/20120206030006/http://www.maroon5.com/lo_fi/bio.html May, 2007
 Yamaha website, Sitting in with Maroon5, September 2004

External links
 Maroon 5 Official Website

Maroon 5 members
Living people
1970 births
Alternative rock drummers
People from Woodstock, New York
American rock drummers
20th-century American drummers
American male drummers
21st-century American drummers
Gunn High School alumni